ABCD1 is a protein that transfers fatty acids into peroxisomes.

Function 

The protein encoded by this gene is a member of the superfamily of ATP-binding cassette (ABC) transporters. ABC proteins transport various molecules across extra- and intra-cellular membranes. ABC genes are divided into seven distinct subfamilies (ABC1, MDR/TAP, MRP, ALD, OABP, GCN20, White). This protein is a member of the ALD subfamily, which is involved in peroxisomal import of fatty acids and/or fatty acyl-CoAs in the organelle. All known peroxisomal ABC transporters are half transporters which require a partner half transporter molecule to form a functional homodimeric or heterodimeric transporter. This peroxisomal membrane protein is likely involved in the peroxisomal transport or catabolism of very long chain fatty acids.

Clinical significance 

Defects in this gene have been identified as the underlying cause of adrenoleukodystrophy, an X-chromosome recessively inherited demyelinating disorder of the nervous system.

Model organisms 
				
Model organisms have been used in the study of ABCD1 function. A conditional knockout mouse line, called Abcd1tm1a(EUCOMM)Wtsi was generated as part of the International Knockout Mouse Consortium program — a high-throughput mutagenesis project to generate and distribute animal models of disease to interested scientists — at the Wellcome Trust Sanger Institute.

Male and female animals underwent a standardized phenotypic screen to determine the effects of deletion. Twenty four tests were carried out on mutant mice but no significant abnormalities were observed.

Interactions 

ABCD1 has been shown to interact with PEX19.

References

Further reading

External links 
  GeneReviews/NIH/NCBI/UW entry on X-Linked Adrenoleukodystrophy
 
 
 

ATP-binding cassette transporters
Genes mutated in mice